Football Academy is a football game released in 2009 for the Nintendo DS.

Gameplay
The game begins with the player creating a new football team under the supervision of former Chelsea Football Club manager Luiz Felipe Scolari, who in the game serves as the "Academy Master". After demonstrating knowledge of the sport and building a team, players can enter their team in matches against real European teams, the results of which are statistically determined.

The game includes 14 minigames, "Football IQ" assessments, player collection, team building, and interactive matches. Players can also play matches and trade players with one another over Wi-Fi.

Reception

The game received mixed reviews upon release and has a Metacritic score of 66/100 based on 12 reviews. Wesley Yin-Poole, writing for VideoGamer.com, praised the addictive nature of player collection and gave the game a score of 8/10.

References

External links
 EA SPORTS Football Academy website
 

2009 video games
Association football video games
Europe-exclusive video games
Electronic Arts games
EA Sports games
Nintendo DS games
Nintendo DS-only games
Video games developed in Canada